Neokuguaglucoside is a chemical compound with formula , isolated from the fruit of the bitter melon vine (Momordica charantia, called kǔguā in Chinese), where it occurs at 23 mg/35 kg.  It is a triterpene glucoside with the cucurbitane skeleton.  It is a white powder, soluble in methanol and butanol.

See also 
 Kuguaglycoside

References 

Triterpene glycosides
Glucosides